The 1922 Liège–Bastogne–Liège was the 12th edition of the Liège–Bastogne–Liège cycle race and was held on 9 April 1922. The race started and finished in Liège. The race was won by Louis Mottiat.

General classification

References

1922
1922 in Belgian sport